Buff (latin bubalinus) is a light brownish yellow, ochreous colour, typical of buff leather. Buff is a mixture of yellow ochre and white: two parts of white lead and one part of yellow ochre produces a good buff, or white lead may be tinted with French ochre alone.

As an RYB quaternary colour, it is the colour produced by an equal mix of the tertiary colours citron and russet.

Etymology
 

The first recorded use of the word buff to describe a colour was in The London Gazette of 1686, describing a uniform to be "...a Red Coat with a Buff-colour'd lining".  It referred to the colour of undyed buffalo leather, such as soldiers wore as some protection: an eyewitness to the death in the Battle of Edgehill (1642) of Sir Edmund Verney noted "he would neither put on arms [armour] or buff coat the day of the battle". Such buff leather was suitable for buffing or serving as a buffer between polished objects. It is not clear which bovine "buffalo" referred to, but it may not have been any of the animals called "buffalo" today.

Derived terms
The word buff meaning "enthusiast" or "expert" (US English) derives from the colour "buff", specifically from the buff-coloured uniform facings of 19th-century New York City volunteer firemen, who inspired partisan followers among particularly keen fire watchers.

"In the buff", today meaning naked, originally applied to English soldiers wearing the buff leather tunic that was their uniform until the 17th century. The "naked" signification is due to the perception that (English) skin is buff-coloured.

In nature

Geology 
Sand, rock, and loess tend to be buff in many areas.

Natural selection 
Because buff is effective in camouflage, it is often naturally selected. 

Many species are named for their buff markings, including the buff arches moth, the buff-bellied climbing mouse, and at least sixty birds, including the buff-fronted quail-dove, the buff-vented bulbul, and the buff-spotted flufftail.

In culture

Architecture 
In areas where buff raw materials are available, buff walls and buildings may be found. Cotswold stone is an example of such a material.

Stationery and art
Unless bleached or dyed, paper products, such as Manila paper, tend to be buff. Buff envelopes are used extensively in commercial mailings.

Buff paper is sometimes favoured by artists seeking a neutral background colour for drawings, especially those featuring the colour white.

Artificial selection
Buff domesticated animals and plants have been created, including dogs, cats, and poultry. The word buff is used in written standards of several breeds, and some, such as the Buff turkey, are specifically named "buff".

Clothing 
In 16th- and 17th-century European cultures, buff waistcoats ("vests" in American English), were considered proper casual wear. In the 17th century, the traditional colour of formal dress boot uppers was often described as "buff".

John Bull
Clothing depicted on John Bull, a national personification of Britain in general and England in particular, in political cartoons and similar graphic works, has often been buff coloured. Bull's buff waistcoats, topcoats, trousers and boot uppers were typical of 18th- and 19th-century Englishmen.

17th-century military uniforms

The British army
The Royal East Kent Regiment was nicknamed "The Buffs" from the colour of their waistcoats. The phrase "Steady the Buffs!", popularised by Rudyard Kipling in his 1888 work Soldiers Three, has its origins during 2nd Battalion's garrison duties in Malta. Adjutant Cotter, not wanting to be shown up in front of his former regiment, the 21st Royal (North British) Fusiliers, spurred his men on with the words: "Steady, the Buffs! The Fusiliers are watching you."

U.S. Army
The uniform of the American Continental Army was buff and blue.

Buff is the traditional colour of the U.S. Army Quartermaster Corps.

The U.S. Army Institute of Heraldry specifies a "buff" tincture for certain coats of arms, often treating it as a metal for purposes of the rule of tincture.

U.S. universities, fraternities and schools

The colours of George Washington University and Hamilton College are buff and blue, modelled on the military uniform of General George Washington and the Continental Army. Both General Washington and Alexander Hamilton, as chief of staff, had a role in the design of the uniforms.

Other school colours described as "buff and blue" include Gallaudet University in Washington, D.C., and Punahou School in Honolulu, Hawaii.

Buff is one of three colours of the Alpha Gamma Delta fraternity, and one of two colours of the Delta Chi fraternity.

U.S. state flags
The flags of Delaware and New Jersey, and the former flags of New York and Maine, officially feature buff.

Political usage
The colours of the Whig Party, a British political faction, and later political party, as well as the American Whig Party, were buff and blue.

White Star buff
The funnels of the RMS Titanic and all other ships of the White Star Line were designated to be "buff with a black top" in order to indicate their ownership. There is some uncertainty among experts, however, as to the exact shade of what is now called "White Star buff". There is no surviving paint or formula, and although there are many painted postcards and at least seven colour photographs of White Star liners, the shades of the funnels in these varies due to many factors including the conditions under which they were originally made and the ageing of the pigments in which they were printed.  Speaking mostly to scale modellers, the Titanic Research and Modelling Association currently recommend a colour "in the range of the Marschall color", meaning  the colour in illustrations in a particular book.

As a relatively inexpensive and readily available paint colour, and one which went well alongside the near-universal black hull and white superstructure used on steamships at the time, White Star was far from the only shipping line to use a shade of buff as a funnel colour. The Orient Line and Norddeutscher Lloyd used an entirely buff funnel without the black top, while Canadian Pacific and the Swedish American Line employed a buff funnel with a representation of the company's house flag on them. The Bibby Line and the Fyffes Line are two of several firms to use the same "buff with a black top" scheme as White Star, but with a similar lack of certainty as to the exact shade used and how this differed from the famous White Star scheme.

In Canadian heraldry
As well as being a colour used by the United States Army Institute of Heraldry, buff is also recognised as a tincture by the Canadian Heraldic Authority. It appears on the heraldic badge and flag of the Correctional Service of Canada.

See also

List of colours
Beige, a similar colour
Fallow
Tan, a slightly darker, redder colour
Tawny

References

Quaternary colors
Shades of brown
Shades of yellow
Shades of orange
Colours (heraldry)
Metals (heraldry)
hi:भूरा#बादामी